The Humboldt Salt Marsh in the Humboldt Sink of northwestern Nevada is a wetland that is 1 of 2 salt marshes within the state (cf. Tonopah Wetland in the Tonopah Basin).  It is protected within the Humboldt Wildlife Management Area.

References

Landforms of Churchill County, Nevada
Wetlands of Nevada
Marshes of the United States